Rajvanshi Devi (17 July 1886 – 9 September 1962) was an Indian freedom fighter who served as 1st First Lady of India as the spouse of Rajendra Prasad, President of India.

Personal life 
She was born in 17 July 1886. Her father was mukhtiyar in Arrah and her brother was lawyer in Ballia. She was a true-to-tradition Hindu lady. She married Rajendra Prasad in June 1896 when he was 12 years old. She married with Rajendra Prasad at Dalan Chhapra Village, Ballia district. In 1947, she was arrested along with Chandrawati Devi for celebrating Indian independence movement at Patna. She inaugurated Rajendra Prasad's Hospital. She died in 9 September 1962. After her death, her husband donated her jewelry to India's treasury  during Sino-Indian War.

Honor 

 In 1962, a higher secondary school built in Siwan, Bihar (Home City of Rajendra Prasad) was named after.

References 

1896 births
1962 deaths
First ladies and gentlemen of India